Pryteria is a genus of moths in the family Erebidae.

Species
 Pryteria apicata Schaus, 1905
 Pryteria apicella Strand, 1919
 Pryteria alboatra Rothschild, 1909
 Pryteria colombiana Rothschild, 1933
 Pryteria costata Möschler, 1882
 Pryteria hamifera Dognin, 1907
 Pryteria semicostalis Rothschild, 1909
 Pryteria unifascia Druce, 1899

References

Natural History Museum Lepidoptera generic names catalog

Phaegopterina
Moth genera